This is an episode list for the animated television series G.I. Joe Extreme.

Episodes

Season 1 (1995–1996)

Season 2 (1996–1997)

References

External links 
 List of G.I. Joe Extreme episodes at the Internet Movie Database

 
G. I. Joe Extreme